On a frosty Boxing day in 1870 the driver of the 16:25 from London King's Cross to Peterborough noticed an 'uneasy oscillation' as he passed over Marshmoor level crossing, 2 miles south of Hatfield station.  He peered back and discovered he had lost his train and pulled up. He reversed back, preceded by his fireman on foot showing a red light. They were met by the white-faced guard who told them there had been a disaster.  The driver reversed direction again and sped to Hatfield to warn oncoming traffic and summon help. 

It transpired that as the train approached the crossing the left hand leading wheel of the van at the front of the train had disintegrated and the coupling between the van and the locomotive had parted and the van and two following coaches had run off the rails onto the roadway demolishing a wall, and the crossing gates and posts and killing the mother and sister of a signalman who were waiting at the crossing. In addition six passengers in the two coaches were killed.

The accident inspector criticized the method of tyre fixing and recommended, not for the first time, the use of Mansell composite wheels on passenger rolling stock.

Sources

External links
Board of Trade report

Railway accidents and incidents in Hertfordshire
Railway accidents in 1870
1870 in England
History of Hertfordshire
Accidents and incidents involving Great Northern Railway (Great Britain)
Hatfield, Hertfordshire
Derailments in England
19th century in Hertfordshire
December 1870 events
1870 disasters in the United Kingdom